Kheyrabad (also Romanized as Kheyrābād) is a village in Hamedanak Rural District, in Bostan District of Baharestan County, Tehran province, Iran. At the 2006 National Census, its population was 14,018 in 3,240 households, when it was in Robat Karim County. The following census in 2011 counted 17,267 people in 4,645 households, by which time the district had been separated from the county and Baharestan County established.

References 

Baharestan County

Populated places in Tehran Province

Populated places in Baharestan County